Rising of the lights was an illness or obstructive condition of the larynx, trachea, or lungs, possibly croup. It was a common entry on bills of mortality in the seventeenth century. Lights in this case referred to the lungs.

Treatment

In culture
In his A New Booke of Mistakes (1637), Robert Chamberlain gives a humorous epitaph:

References

Further reading

History of medicine
Human diseases and disorders